Val Müstair is a municipality in the Engiadina Bassa/Val Müstair Region in the Swiss canton of Graubünden. It was formed on 1 January 2009 through the merger of Tschierv, Fuldera, Lü, Valchava, Santa Maria Val Müstair and Müstair.

Demographics

Geography
 
The Val Müstair (German: Münstertal) is a mountain valley in the Swiss Alps. It connects the Fuorn Pass, with the Italian province of South Tyrol and the Vinschgau.

The Benedictine Convent of Saint John at Müstair (monastery), a World Heritage Site, was probably founded by Charlemagne, sharing history with its neighbor, the Marienberg Abbey.

The most important villages in the Val Müstair are: Tschierv, Valchava, Sta. Maria, Müstair (all Swiss) and Taufers im Münstertal in South Tyrol. There are no other inhabited connected valleys, but the road over the Umbrail Pass (and the Stelvio Pass) is connected with Sta. Maria.

The largest part of the valley is part of the Swiss canton of Graubünden. A small part lies within the Italian province of South Tyrol. The border is located at approximately 1245 meter between Müstair (1247 meter) and Taufers im Münstertal (1240 meter).

The river in the valley is the Rom (Il Rom or Rombach).

Naming convention 
Contrary to the common notion, where the beginning of a valley is referred as the "upper valley" and the end as the "lower valley", in Val Müstair these are referred to as "inner" and "outer" respectively. This is often reflected in location names.

For instance, the valley is traditionally divided into three thirds:
 Terzal d'Aint (inner third) with Tschierv, Fuldera and Lü
 Terzal d'Immez (middle third) with Valchava and Sta. Maria
 Terzal d'Oura (outer third) with Müstair
Incidentally, this division corresponds to the first three plateaus occurring on the Swiss part of the valley.

Language
The majority of the population in the new municipality speaks Romansh, with a large German speaking minority.  The following table lists the historical language distribution of the formerly independent municipalities and also for the combined municipality:

Heritage sites of national significance
The Benedictine Convent of Saint John is both listed as a Swiss heritage site of national significance and a UNESCO World Heritage Site.

Weather
Müstair village has an average of 86.7 days of rain per year and on average receives  of precipitation. During this month there is precipitation for an average of 9.3 days. The month with the most days of precipitation is May, with an average of 10, but with only  of precipitation.

The higher elevation village of Sta. Maria Val Müstair has an average of 94.6 days of rain per year and on average receives  of precipitation. The wettest month is August during which time Sta. During this month there is precipitation for an average of 10.6 days.

Tourism
There is a small amount of car parking in the village. It is the starting point for a number of hiking trails. Above Tschierv, at the mountain Minschuns, is a little ski resort. In 2009, during the International Year of Astronomy, a new public observatory Alpine Astrovillage Lü-Stailas was inaugurated. The center is equipped with robotic telescopes for direct observations, as well as for astrophotography. The equipment is also used to provide introductory courses for amateur astronomers.

Sports
Val Müstair has hosted several stages of the Tour de Ski, a cross-country skiing stage event.

Notable residents 
Donna Leon, Usonian crime novelist.

Notes and references

See also 
 Nature parks in Switzerland

External links

Cumün da Val Müstair Official website 
Turissem Val Müstair Tourism office 
Convent of St. John
Online map
Alpine Astro Village

 
Municipalities of Graubünden
Mustair
Mustair
Mustair
Cultural property of national significance in Graubünden
World Heritage Sites in Switzerland
Ski areas and resorts in Switzerland